Selagia uralensis is a species of snout moth. It is found in Russia.

The wingspan is 13–14 mm.

References

Moths described in 1910
Phycitini